Mountain Empire Community College is a public community college in unincorporated Wise County, Virginia, near Big Stone Gap. It is one of the 23 schools in the Virginia Community College System. The college serves residents of Dickenson, Lee, Scott, and Wise counties, as well as the City of Norton. The first classes were offered in the Fall of 1972. Dr. Terrance Suarez became the school's fifth president in January 2002.

References

External links
Official website

Two-year colleges in the United States
Virginia Community College System
Education in Wise County, Virginia
Educational institutions established in 1972
Universities and colleges accredited by the Southern Association of Colleges and Schools
Buildings and structures in Wise County, Virginia
1972 establishments in Virginia